Riyadul Hasan Rafi (born 29 December 1999) is a Bangladeshi professional footballer who plays as a defender for Bangladesh Premier League club Abahani Limited Dhaka and the Bangladesh national team.

International goals

U-19 team
Scores and results list Bangladesh's goal tally first.

Career statistics

International apps

Notes

References 

1999 births
Living people
Bangladeshi footballers
Bangladesh international footballers
Association football defenders
Footballers at the 2018 Asian Games
Asian Games competitors for Bangladesh
Saif SC players
Abahani Limited (Dhaka) players
Bangladesh Football Premier League players